The 10,000 metres at the 2000 Summer Olympics as part of the athletics programme were held at Stadium Australia on Friday 22 September, and Monday 25 September 2000.

Without Haile Gebrselassie, Paul Tergat would have won everything since the previous Olympics.  He was the silver medalist in the previous Olympics and the ensuing two world championships.  He was the World Cross Country Champion five times in a row in Gebrselassie's absence.  The final broke down to a team race, with three Kenyans vs Ethiopians Gebrselassie and Assefa Mezgebu.  With a lap to go, John Korir held the lead marked by Gebrselassie, with Tergat marking him.  Mezgebu moved from behind Tergat to Gebrselassie's shoulder, boxing Tergat along the rail through the penultimate turn.  Down the backstretch, Tergat slowed down a step to get out of the box, then sprinting around the outside, past everyone.  The sprint was on.  Unlike previous finals, Tergat had the drop on Gebrselassie, making Geb chase, with only Mezgebu able to hold on behind.  Down the homestretch both were in full sprint, Tergat ahead, Gebrselassie making progress but not advancing enough to pass.  Gebrselassie continued to press, drawing even with less than ten metres to go.  Tergat strained, his last several steps losing his balance while Gebrselassie held form to take the gold again.

Records

Medalists

Results
All times shown are in seconds.
 Q denotes qualification by place in heat.
 q denotes qualification by overall place.
 DNS denotes did not start.
 DNF denotes did not finish.
 DQ denotes disqualification.
 NR denotes national record.
 OR denotes Olympic record.
 WR denotes world record.
 PB denotes personal best.
 SB denotes season best.

Qualifying heats
The top eight runners in each of the initial two heats automatically qualified for the final. The next four fastest runners from across the heats also qualified. There were a total number of 34 participating athletes.

Overall Results Semi-Finals

Final

References

External links
 Official Report

10000 metres, Men's
10,000 metres at the Olympics
Men's events at the 2000 Summer Olympics